Debbie Freeman defeated Susan Leo in the final, 7–6, 7–5 to win the girls' singles tennis title at the 1980 Wimbledon Championships.

Seeds

  Susan Mascarin (quarterfinals)
  Kathy Horvath (semifinals)
  Kelly Henry (second round)
  Renata Šašak (first round)
  Susan Leo (final)
  Elise Burgin (first round)
  Patrizia Murgo (second round)
  Isabelle Villiger (semifinals)

Draw

Finals

Top half

Section 1

Section 2

Bottom half

Section 3

Section 4

References

External links

Girls' Singles
Wimbledon Championship by year – Girls' singles
Wimb